is a Japanese video game developer, publisher, arcade manufacturer and distribution company based in Tokyo. A subsidiary of Sega, the company is known for video game series such as Megami Tensei, Persona, Etrian Odyssey, and Trauma Center, as well as Print Club (Purikura) arcade machines. Its corporate mascot is Jack Frost, a snowman-like character from their Shin Megami Tensei series. Outside of video games, the company is known for their Purikura arcade machines, which are selfie photo sticker booths popular in East Asia.

Altus was established in April 1986 and spent its early years as a video game developer for other companies. It became a video game publisher of its own in 1989 and existed until it was merged into Index Corporation in October 2010. After the dissolution, the name Atlus continued as a brand used by Index Corporation for video game publishing until 2013, when it was bought by Sega and revived as a company initially under the name Sega Dream Corporation.

Atlus has three development divisions: Creative Department 1st Production (Team Maniax), Creative Department 2nd Production (P-Studio), and Creative Department 3rd Production (Studio Zero). A North American branch of the company, Atlus West, was founded in 1991 in order to focus on publishing and localizing games for North America. A European branch, which is handled via the London-based Sega Europe, was founded in 2017.

History 

Atlus began on 7 April 1986 as a video game developer of computer games for other companies. In January 1987, Atlus started selling amusement equipment. It expanded into the sale of karaoke equipment in March 1989. Atlus released the first video game under its own name in 1989: Puzzle Boy for the Game Boy.

Atlus started in the arcade industry in the 1990s by manufacturing its first arcade video game, BlaZeon, in 1992. In 1995, Atlus launched Print Club (Purikura) at arcades in partnership with Sega. It is a photo sticker booth that produces selfie photos. It was conceived by Atlus employee Sasaki Miho in 1994; her bosses at Atlus were initially reluctant about the idea, before later deciding to go ahead with it. Atlus and Sega introduced Purikura in February 1995, initially at game arcades, before expanding to other popular culture locations such as fast food shops, train stations, karaoke establishments and bowling alleys. Purikura became a popular form of entertainment among youths across East Asia, laying the foundations for modern selfie culture. It also introduced a large female demographic to the company's previously male-dominated arcade customer base. By 1996, it accounted for 70% of the company's revenue. By 1997, about 47,000 Purikura machines had been sold, earning Sega an estimated  or  annually from Purikura sales that year. Various other similar purikira machines appeared from other manufacturers, with Sega controlling about half of the market in 1997.

Atlus entered the Tokyo Stock Exchange in 1997, listing on the JASDAQ. In its goal to further increase its presence in the amusement industry, Atlus acquired the manufacturer Apies from Yubis Corporation in 1999. In 2000, Atlus formed a joint venture with Kadokawa Shoten to distribute and sell games. Atlus suffered from deficit financial results in both 1999 and 2000. To address the issue, Atlus established a management reform plan in 2001. In its restructuring efforts, Atlus sold two subsidiaries (one of them being Apies) to their respective employees as part of a management buyout.

In October 2001, Atlus acquired Career Soft, and became the sole publisher of the Growlanser series: a real-time strategy role-playing game from the creators of the Langrisser series. In 2004, after the release of Growlanser IV, the majority of Career Soft's staff was merged into the main development team of Atlus where they worked on the Shin Megami Tensei: Devil Survivor games. As a developer brand, Career Soft was eventually dissolved.

In October 2003, Japanese toy company Takara acquired Atlus. On 21 November 2006, Index Holdings announced the acquisition of Atlus, effective on 30 October 2006, and purchased 7.7 million shares (54.93 percent; 77,000 votes, or 54.96 percent of the voting rights) on 20 November 2006. Atlus became an Index Holdings subsidiary on 29 November 2006.

In March 2009, Atlus and Sting Entertainment announced a publishing partnership making Atlus the only publisher of Sting-developed games in Japan. On 17 September 2009, Index Holdings announced the separation of Atlus' amusement facility and related business into a subsidiary, New Entertainment Waves, effective on 1 December. One hundred seventy-two shares of the subsidiary's stock were also transferred to Chushoukigyou Leisure on 1 December.

On 30 August 2010, Index Holdings announced its merger with Atlus, with Index Holdings being the surviving company, effective on 1 October. After the merger, Index Holdings would continue to operate the Atlus brand. Although fans were concerned about the company's future, CEO Shinichi Suzuki said that Atlus would continue to provide the "finest quality game experiences possible" and the merger "further strengthens the foundation of Atlus, both in Japan and here in the United States." On 9 November 2010 Index Holdings announced its renaming to Index Corporation, to be confirmed at the shareholders meeting on 25 November 2010 and effective on 1 December.

From 2010 to 2013, Atlus, as a company, ceased to exist and its name became a brand of Index Corporation for video games in Japan. However, Atlus USA remained active and was renamed Index Digital Media, serving as the North American subsidiary for Index Corporation. Much like in Japan, video games continued to be released in that region under the Atlus name during this period. In June 2013, it was reported that Index Corporation filed for civil rehabilitation proceedings, facing bankruptcy with debts of ¥24.5 billion. An Atlus USA spokesperson said that Index Digital Media and the Atlus brand were unaffected by the proceedings.

On 18 September 2013, it was reported that Sega won a bid to acquire the bankrupt Index for ¥14 billion. All Index operations, including the Atlus brand and Index Digital Media (Atlus USA), were transferred on 1 November 2013 to Sega Dream Corporation (a new subsidiary established on 5 September 2013). That day, Sega announced that it would change the name of Sega Dream Corporation to Index Corporation.

On 18 February 2014, Sega announced the separation of Index Corporation's contents and solution businesses into a new subsidiary, Index Corporation, renaming the old Index Corporation and its remaining digital game business division to Atlus effective 1 April 2014. The new Atlus would include the foreign subsidiary, Index Digital Media, which would revert its name back to Atlus USA at the establishment of the new Atlus.

In April 2017, Sega Sammy Holdings announced a relocation of head office functions of the Sega Sammy Group and its major domestic subsidiaries located in the Tokyo metropolitan area to Shinagawa-ku by January 2018. Their stated reasoning was to promote cooperation among companies and creation of more active interaction of personnel, while pursuing efficient group management by consolidating scattered head office functions of the group. Atlus is one of the companies that has relocated in response to this. The company has three divisions: Creative Department 1st Production (responsible for managing the Shin Megami Tensei and Etrian Odyssey series), Creative Department 2nd Production (also called P-Studio and responsible for managing the Persona series), and Creative Department 3rd Production (also called Studio Zero).

Controversies 
Atlus has sued two people related to its long-defunct MMO Shin Megami Tensei: Imagine. The complaint was first filed in December of 2021 against the owner of 'Rekueimu Games' Jonathan Sum and a yet-unidentified administrator named COMP_hack. The court documents were made public on September of 2022. Atlus alleges that their copyright was infringed, as the pair hosted a website that was a near exact copy of Atlus' website and distributed an exact copy of their game Shin Megami Tensei: Imagine. One of the main sources of Atlus' complaints was that the offending website contained false copyright information for 'Rekueimu Games', who do not own Shin Megami Tensei: Imagine or any of its associated media. The court document states that Atlus believes that the 'unauthorized acts as described herein have caused and will continue to cause irreparable damage to Atlus'. Atlus believes that the pair have violated 17 U.S.C. § 50 three times and Digital Millennium Copyright Act, 17 U.S.C. § 1202 once.

Controversy began online when people mistakenly believed another group named ReIMAGINE, who run a similar service to Rekueimu Games, was being targeted by the lawsuit, as their servers coincidentally went down on the same day as the suit became public knowledge. As a precaution against a similar lawsuit, ReIMAGINE chose to close their services on the 26th of September.

International branches

Atlus West

Atlus West (formerly known as Atlus U.S.A., Inc.) established in 1991 and based in Irvine, California, is the American subsidiary of Atlus and publishes games created by Atlus and other developers. It was formally called Index Digital Media from 2010 to 2014 in response to Atlus being dissolved into Index Corporation.

A number of Megami Tensei games have not been released in North America. During the 1990s, Jack Bros. for Virtual Boy, Revelations: Persona for PlayStation and Revelations: The Demon Slayer for the Game Boy Color were the first three games in the series to have a North American release. The 2004 release of Shin Megami Tensei: Nocturne was the first main-series video-game release in the U.S. Since then, the series has continued to be localized and released in the US, including games such as Persona 3, Devil Summoner: Raidou Kuzunoha vs. The Soulless Army, and Shin Megami Tensei: Strange Journey.

Atlus West has localized cult classic Disgaea: Hour of Darkness, created by Nippon Ichi Software. The company have also published the tactical role-playing game Tactics Ogre and Game Boy Advance remakes of the Kunio-kun and Double Dragon games for Million (a company composed of former Technōs Japan employees). Other notable titles include Snowboard Kids and Snowboard Kids 2 (for Nintendo 64) and Odin Sphere and the Trauma Center series. Atlus USA released Riviera: The Promised Land, a role-playing video game for the Game Boy Advance previously released for the Wonderswan Color, in 2004 in collaboration with Sting and Bandai. In 2006 Atlus USA and Sting released Yggdra Union, a strategy role-playing game (RPG) for the Game Boy Advance. After Working Designs' publication of Growlanser Generations, they released Growlanser: Heritage of War in 2005 and Growlanser Wayfarer of Time in 2012.

The company established an online division, including the Atlus Online portal which is servicing Neo Steam: The Shattered Continent and Shin Megami Tensei: Imagine. On 31 March 2013, Index Digital Media's Atlus Online Division was purchased by Marvelous AQL and transferred to Xseed Games. Atlus USA has published games under the Marl Kingdom name, beginning with Rhapsody: A Musical Adventure in 2000. On 18 February 2014 Sega announced that Index Digital Media would revert its name back to Atlus USA. In March 2016, Sega announced that all the future localized products from Atlus for North America will be published by Sega. Between 2019 and 2020, Atlus USA changed its public brand name to Atlus West.

Europe and Oceania 
Until 2017, Atlus did not have a dedicated European division for publishing and distributing their titles within the European and Oceania region. Instead, many of Atlus' titles were published in these regions by Nippon Ichi Software (NIS) and its American division NIS America. Following Atlus's acquisition by Sega Sammy Holdings, NIS found that it became more difficult to work between Sega and Atlus for distribution and in April 2016, formally ended its distribution partnership with Atlus. In July 2016, Deep Silver announced that it had come to agreement to become Atlus' distributor for Europe and Oceania, and would begin to publish titles in both retail and digital form. In August 2017, Atlus announced that they had opened a European distribution team located in Sega Europe's offices in London that would publish all its games going forward.

Corporate mascot 

Jack Frost, who appears as a demon character in the Shin Megami Tensei franchise, is the company mascot. Resembling a snowman, he has teeth, a tail and no nose, and wears a jester hat, collar, and shoes. His catchphrase is "Hee-Ho". He has appeared in several games in the Shin Megami Tensei series, as well as the Jack Bros. and Persona games. Jack Frost is a hidden character in the North American and Japanese versions of SBK: Snowboard Kids, with a larger role in the Japanese version. He has a family; more relatives were created since Shin Megami Tensei II, including King Frost, Pyro Jack (Known as "Jack-O-Lantern" in some localizations), Frost 5 Senshi, and Black Frost.

Media based on Atlus games 
 Shin Megami Tensei: Tokyo Mokushiroku
 Shin Megami Tensei: Devil Summoner (TV Series)
 Shin Megami Tensei: Devil Children
 Shin Megami Tensei: Devil Children 2 Light & Dark
 Devil Survivor 2: The Animation
 Persona: Trinity Soul
 Persona 4: The Animation
 Persona 4: The Golden Animation
 Persona 3 The Movie: #1 Spring of Birth
 Persona 3 The Movie: #2 Midsummer Knight's Dream
 Persona 3 The Movie: #3 Falling Down
 Persona 3 The Movie: #4 Winter of Rebirth
 Persona 5: The Animation – The Day Breakers
 Persona 5: The Animation

References

External links 
  

Japanese companies established in 1986
Japanese companies established in 2013
Amusement companies of Japan
Software companies based in Tokyo
Video game companies established in 1986
Video game companies established in 2013
Re-established companies
Sega divisions and subsidiaries
Video game companies of Japan
Video game development companies
Video game publishers